Sleaford is a town in Lincolnshire, England.

Sleaford may also refer to:

Places

Australia
Sleaford, South Australia (disambiguation), articles associated with the locality in South Australia

United Kingdom
Sleaford, Lincolnshire 
Sleaford railway station
Sleaford (UK Parliament constituency)
Sleaford, Hampshire, a hamlet in Hampshire, England

See also